Rose Estes is the author of many fantasy and science fiction books, including full-length novels and multiple choice gamebooks.

Career
As an employee of Tactical Studies Rules (TSR), Rose Estes came up with an idea for a new sort of game, which would become the Endless Quest. Estes wrote the first four books in the series, beginning with Dungeon of Dread (1982). These first four Endless Quest books were on the Best Seller list for more than six months. TSR considered Endless Quest ultimately a fad, and worked to diversify its new mainstream publishing; Estes and James M. Ward thus formed an education department, which ultimately failed, due to TSR's decision not to hire educational sales staff. After contributing extensively to TSR's Dungeons & Dragons Endless Quest series (of which she wrote the first six, as well as others later down the line), she wrote her first full-length novel, Children of the Dragon (1985). After Gary Gygax left TSR, Estes wrote new books in the "Greyhawk Adventures" series, starting with Master Wolf (1987) and ending with The Eyes Have it (1989). She continued to write for TSR by writing six volumes in a series of Greyhawk novels. She contributed to other series, but continued to write books and start series of her own that, like Children of the Dragon, take place in a fantasy or science fiction world created by her own imagination. She also wrote the Golden Book Music Video Sing, Giggle and Grin.

Rose Estes began reading at the age of two, and as a child she was already imagining fantastic places. Before becoming a writer, she "put in time as a hippie, a student, a newspaper reporter, and an advertising copy writer." She has traveled extensively throughout the Americas. She has four children.

Books

Endless Quest
Books in the Endless Quest series:
 Dungeon of Dread (Endless Quest Book 1) (1982)
 Mountain of Mirrors (Endless Quest Book 2) (1982)
 Pillars of Pentegarn (Endless Quest Book 3) (1983)
 Return to Brookmere (Endless Quest Book 4) (1982)
 Revolt of the Dwarves (Endless Quest Book 5) (1983)
 Revenge of the Rainbow Dragons (Endless Quest Book 6) (1983)
 Hero of Washington Square (Endless Quest Book 7) (1983)
 Circus of Fear (Endless Quest Book 10)(1983)
 Dragon of Doom (Endless Quest Book 13) (1983)

Mountain of Mirrors was converted into an adventure for the computer game Neverwinter Nights.

Find Your Fate
 Indiana Jones and the Lost Treasure of Sheeba (1984)
 The Three Investigators — The Case of the Dancing Dinosaur (1985)
 The Trail of Death (1985)
 The Mystery of the Turkish Tattoo (1986)

Greyhawk Adventures
 Master Wolf (Greyhawk Adventures, Vol. 3) (1987)
 The Price of Power (Greyhawk Adventures, Vol. 4) (1987)
 The Demon Hand (Greyhawk Adventures, Vol. 5) (1988)
 The Name of the Game (Greyhawk Adventures, Vol. 6) (1988)
Dragon in Amber (Greyhawk Adventure Series Vol. 7) (1988)
 The Eyes Have It (A Greyhawk Adventures Series Vol. 8) (1989)

Her novel The Eyes have It uses exactly the same cover artwork (a Keith Parkinson painting) as the first Endless Quest Crimson Crystal Adventures gamebook, Riddle of the Griffon by Susan Lawson. In most instances, The Eyes Have It is given no volume number. It is not directly identified as part of the Greyhawk Adventures series on most websites, as well as official Dungeons and Dragons publications.

Hunter
 The Hunter (1990)
 The Hunter: On Arena (1991)
 The Hunter: Victorious (1992)

Katherine Sinclair
 Troll Quest (1995)
 Troll Taken (1993)

Rune Sword Series
 Skryling's Blade (Rune Sword, No. 2) (1990) (with Tom Wham)
 The Stone of Time (Rune Sword, No. 6) (1992)

Saga of the Lost Lands
 Saga of the Lost Lands: Blood of the Tiger (Vol. 1) (1987)
 Saga of the Lost Lands: Brother to the Lion (Vol. 2) (1988)
 Saga of the Lost Lands: Spirit of the Hawk (Vol. 3) (1988)

Other books
 Children of the Dragon (1985)
 Elfwood (1992)
 Iron Dragons: Mountains and Madness (1993)
 The Case of the Dancing Dinosaur (1985)
 The Chow Chow Club, Inc. Celebrates 100 Years: 1906-2006 (2006)
The West Highland White Terrier. Its History Through Word, Art and Vintage Photographs
Vintage Photos of Terriers (2006)

References

External links
 

 Bibliography at Fantastic Fiction, with bibliography and cover images
 Hauser Gallery – Rose Estes business
 The Woof Gang – Rose Estes business

 

20th-century American novelists
20th-century American women writers
21st-century American women
American fantasy writers
American gamebook writers
American science fiction writers
American women novelists
Living people
Women science fiction and fantasy writers
Year of birth missing (living people)